Vikøyri is the administrative center of the municipality of Vik in Vestland county, Norway. The village is located at the mouth of the Vikja river on the south shore of the Sognefjorden, roughly near the midpoint of Norway's longest fjord. The village lies along Norwegian National Road 13 which leads north to the ferry to Balestrand and south to the village of Vossevangen.

To the north and west of Vikøyri lie the villages of Vangsnes, Feios, and Fresvik.

Vikøyri is the site of one of the Tine cheese factories.  It is the only factory in the world that produces gammelost, a unique Norwegian cheese.  The village also has the only prison in Sogn og Fjordane.  There are also two medieval churches on the south side of the village: Hove Church (built c. 1170) and the Hopperstad Stave Church (built c. 1140).  Vik Church is also located in the village, although it is much newer (built in 1877) and it is the main church for the municipality.

References

Villages in Vestland
Vik